Tales of the Jedi, also known as Star Wars: Tales of the Jedi, is an American animated anthology miniseries created by Dave Filoni. It is part of the Star Wars franchise, exploring different Jedi characters from the prequel trilogy era. The series was produced by Lucasfilm Animation, with Charles Murray as head writer and Filoni as supervising director, for the streaming service Disney+.

Filoni began writing the series while working on the Star Wars series The Mandalorian, and revealed the first official details about it in May 2022. It consists of six episodes split into two "paths", one following the character Ahsoka Tano and the other depicting the character Count Dooku. 

Ashley Eckstein, Corey Burton, Janina Gavankar, Micheál Richardson, TC Carson, Ian McDiarmid, Liam Neeson, Bryce Dallas Howard, Phil LaMarr, Clancy Brown, Matt Lanter, James Arnold Taylor, and Dee Bradley Baker provide voices for the series.

All episodes of Tales of the Jedi were released on Disney+ on October 26, 2022, to critical acclaim.

Premise
Each episode of Tales of the Jedi tells a short story featuring Jedi from the Star Wars prequel trilogy era. The six episodes are split into two "paths": the first following Ahsoka Tano across various points in her life, and the other depicting a young Count Dooku before his fall to the dark side of the Force.

Cast and characters
 Ashley Eckstein as Ahsoka Tano
 Corey Burton as Count Dooku: A former Jedi who became disillusioned with the Jedi Order and fell to the dark side. 
 Burton additionally voices an Armed Villager
 Janina Gavankar as Pav-ti Tano: Ahsoka Tano's mother.
 TC Carson as Mace Windu
 Liam Neeson as Qui-Gon Jinn: Dooku's former Jedi apprentice.
 Micheál Richardson as a young Qui-Gon Jinn
 Bryce Dallas Howard as Yaddle: A female member of Yoda's species and a member of the Jedi Council.
 Ian McDiarmid as Darth Sidious: The Dark Lord of the Sith who became Count Dooku's Sith Master.
 Matt Lanter as Anakin Skywalker: Ahsoka Tano's Jedi Master.
 James Arnold Taylor as Obi-Wan Kenobi: Anakin Skywalker's Jedi Master.
 Phil LaMarr as Bail Organa: Senator from Alderaan.
 Dee Bradley Baker as Captain Rex, Jesse and clone troopers.
 Clancy Brown as an Inquisitor.
 Mark Rolston as Senator Dagonet
 Josh Keaton as Senator Dagonet's son.
 Sunil Malhotra as Nak-il
 Toks Olagundoye as Gantika
 Brian George as Ki-Adi-Mundi
 Flo Di Re as Jocasta Nu
 Terrell Tilford as Semage
 Theo Rossi as Senator Larik
 Andrew Kishino as Guard and Hanel
 Noshir Dalal as Villager
 Vanessa Marshall as Village Elder
 David Shaughnessy as Old Man
 Bryton James as Village Brother
 Dana Davis as Village Sister
 Meg Marchand as Jedi Temple Archive Voice

Yoda, Plo Koon, Tera Sinube, Saesee Tiin, Ima-Gun Di, Caleb Dume, Depa Billaba, and Mon Mothma appear in non-speaking cameos.

Episodes

Production

Development
While traveling to work on the Star Wars series The Mandalorian, Dave Filoni began writing short stories about different Jedi characters from the franchise's prequel trilogy era. Carrie Beck, senior vice president of development and production at Lucasfilm, asked if Filoni wanted to turn these into a series, which he compared to her "find[ing] the money" for a revival of his animated series Star Wars: The Clone Wars on the streaming service Disney+. 

In December 2021, the logo for Tales of the Jedi was included on holiday gifts for Lucasfilm employees alongside logos for upcoming film and television projects at the studio. This was also the name of an unrelated comic book series published by Dark Horse Comics in the 1990s. 

Lucasfilm confirmed the project in April 2022 when the company announced the schedule for Star Wars Celebration, with Filoni set to discuss the animated anthology series in a dedicated panel. This was held at the end of May, and revealed that the series consists of six episodes, five of which are written by Filoni and the other by The Clone Wars writer Charles Murray along with Élan Murray. Each episode is approximately 15 minutes long. Filoni also serves as creator, supervising director, and executive producer, with Athena Yvette Portillo and Beck also executive producers.

Writing
Filoni described the series as exploring "two paths and two choices", with one following the character Ahsoka Tano and the other focusing on Count Dooku. Each character is explored in three different eras of their lives. Comparing the series to The Clone Wars, Filoni noted that Tales of the Jedi was slower paced and like "a series of tone poems" with less dialogue and more visual storytelling. This was inspired by the works of Hayao Miyazaki as well as Filoni's mentor, Star Wars creator George Lucas. Filoni's first idea for the series was to show how Ahsoka was brought to the Jedi Order by Plo Koon, but he changed this to a story about Ahsoka's first hunting trip with her mother because there had not been many stories about "moms being moms" in Star Wars. He felt it was important that "Ahsoka's first experience with someone telling her, 'Don't be afraid,' is her mother." 

Beyond the first episode, which has a happy ending and features the "adorable baby Ahsoka", Filoni warned that "these aren't just fun, happy stories. It gets rough at times." He particularly felt that Dooku's life was "surprisingly tragic", and attributed some of the series' darker episodes to them being written during the COVID-19 pandemic. An aspect of Dooku that Filoni wanted to explore was the relationship with his padawan learner, Qui-Gon Jinn, whom Filoni described as "one of the best and, in some ways, most interesting Jedi, because of his philosophy, which is different from the Jedi Council. And where did he learn that, if not from his mentor, Count Dooku?"

The final episode, titled Resolve, loosely adapts the events of the 2016 novel Ahsoka, originally written by E. K. Johnston. Speaking about the production of the episode, Filoni noted that Resolve was "based on the same outline I gave publishing for the novel" and that the two works thus told the same story. Ashley Eckstein, the actress who voices Ahsoka, stated that the novel had not come into discussion while Resolve was in production and that she never asked Filoni where the episode fell in relation to the novel. She regarded the episode as "an extension of the novel" and the beginning of "that chapter" of Ahsoka's life.

Casting
With the series' announcement in May 2022, it was revealed that Liam Neeson would reprise his role as Qui-Gon Jinn, while his son Micheál Richardson would voice a younger version of the character. Matt Lanter reprises his role as Anakin Skywalker from The Clone Wars, while Janina Gavankar was cast as Ahsoka Tano's mother, Pav-ti Tano. In July 2022, Ashley Eckstein revealed she would be reprising her role as Ahsoka Tano.

Animation
The series uses the same animation style as Star Wars: The Clone Wars and Star Wars: The Bad Batch. Charles Murray, Nathaniel Villanueva, and Saul Ruiz serve as directors for the series.

Music
Kevin Kiner composed music for the series, after previously doing so for The Clone Wars, Rebels and The Bad Batch. Additional music for the series is composed by Sean Kiner, Dean Kiner, David Glen Russell, Nolan Markey and Peter Lam. Walt Disney Records released the soundtrack for Tales of the Jedi digitally on October 26, 2022, alongside the premiere of the series on Disney+.

Marketing
Filoni revealed the first details about the series at a Star Wars Celebration panel in May 2022, where a teaser was shown and the full first episode screened.

Release
Tales of the Jedi premiered on Disney+ on October 26, 2022, with all of its six episodes.

Reception

Audience viewership
According to Parrot Analytics, which looks at consumer engagement in consumer research, streaming, downloads, and on social media, Tales of the Jedi was the 4th most in-demand streaming show in the United States, during the week of October 29, 2022 to November 4, 2022. According to Whip Media, Tales of the Jedi was the 9th most streamed original series across all platforms in the United States, during the week ending October 30, 2022.

Critical response
On the review aggregator website Rotten Tomatoes, 100% of 19 critics' reviews are positive, with an average rating of 8.30/10. The website's critics consensus reads, "Under the reliable stewardship of Dave Filoni, Tales of the Jedi is an absorbing expansion of Star Wars lore that will delight Padawan-level fans and encyclopedic Force scholars alike."

Brian Young of /Film asserted, "These episodes are full of pathos and interesting connections to the broader Star Wars lore. The quality of work from the writers, from Lucasfilm Animation, and the music of Kevin Kiner has never been better. My hope is that these mini-episodes are popular enough to spin more Jedi into the limelight for more tales." Kevin Fox, Jr. of Paste gave the series a grade of 8.2 out of 10, stating, "The overall result, as overseen by Dave Filoni, is surprising and strong. Tales of the Jedi succeeds by saying exactly what it means to and then making its exit, sure to have viewers ready for more. Whether it's ultimately a one-off season or the start of something greater, it's worth Star Wars fans' time to check it out."

Jamie Lovett of ComicBook.com gave the series a grade of 4 out of 5, saying, "These six Tales of the Jedi are beautiful, moving, and deceptively layered for their brevity while packing a few surprises and jaw-dropping moments along the way. Lucasfilm Animation managed to squeeze a lot of Star Wars magic into these shorts, and viewers will only be disappointed that there aren't more of them." Alex Stedman of IGN gave the series a grade of 8 out of 10, writing, "Tales of the Jedi is a strong, tightly written showcase for two important characters in Star Wars lore: Count Dooku and Ahsoka Tano. Dooku in particular gets a good amount of meat added to his character’s bones, while the other episodes feature a welcome look into Ahsoka at different points in her life. It’s moody and methodical at times, while still managing to weave in some beautifully animated action. It may not be absolutely vital Star Wars content, but there are certainly worse ways to revisit these characters before Ahsoka gets her own series."

Accolades 
Tales of the Jedi received a nomination for Outstanding Achievement in Sound Editing - Broadcast Animation at the 2023 Golden Reel Awards. It was also nominated for Outstanding Short-Form Program at the 2023 Producers Guild of America Awards.

Notes

References

External links
 
 
 

Tales of the Jedi (TV series)
2020s American animated television series
2020s American anthology television series
2020s American science fiction television series
2022 American television series debuts
American animated action television series
American animated science fiction television series
American animation anthology series
American computer-animated television series
Animated television series about extraterrestrial life
Animated television shows based on films
Disney+ original programming
Star Wars animated television series
Television series by Lucasfilm